Bank station may refer to:

 Bank and Monument stations, London, England
 Bank station (OC Transpo), Ottawa, Canada

See also